Southwest Center Mall, formerly Red Bird Mall, is a shopping mall located in Dallas, Texas. Originally owned by the DeBartolo family, it opened in 1975.  It was, and remains, the only major one located in the southern half of Dallas. Its original name, Red Bird Mall, came from the Red Bird area of Dallas in which it is located.

Initially, it was anchored by four department stores:
Sears, which anchored on the eastern side of the mall  closed its doors officially to the public January 6, 2019 as part of the closure of 33 Sears stores in the US following the parent company liquidation process for Chapter 11 bankruptcy.
JCPenney, which anchored the western end until 2001; The City of Dallas had possession of the space under a 6-month option to buy, which expired on June 7, 2010 (building has since been demolished).
Sanger-Harris (later Foley's, then Macy's), was in the middle of the mall on the northern side and closed in 2017.
Titche's (later Joske's, then purchased by and renamed Dillard's), was being redeveloped as Fiesta Mundo, but redevelopment stopped and that property still vacant, at middle of the mall on the southern side

Later, Montgomery Ward added a store near the Sears location in 1994, on the same side as Dillard's, but was closed in 2001 and replaced by a Burlington Coat Factory. 
Many of the stores were either opening their first ones in the southern sector of Dallas, or relocated from older shopping centers in the area.

The decline
The mall did well in the beginning, despite its location in the relatively undeveloped southern portion of Dallas. It is located near the intersection of U.S. Route 67 and Interstate 20 at 3662 W. Camp Wisdom Road. As early as the mid-1980s, demographics began to change dramatically in the area surrounding it, and at the same time a perception of crime began to brand the area so shoppers began taking their business elsewhere.  And, in 1988, another regional one, The Parks Mall in Arlington, opened just 15 miles west.

DeBartolo attempted to remodel the mall in 1996, in an attempt to rejuvenate the look. It was then sold to Namco Financial, a California investment group founded by Ezri Namvar, who was later convicted of four counts of wire fraud. In an attempt to attract new tenants, Namco gave it a small refurbishment and new name – Southwest Center Mall. The name changed in 1997. A new food court was added under the reign of DeBartolo. The addition was finished and occupied in 1998 at the northwest entrance. With a price tag of $18 million, it took up the lion's share of updates; upon its change of hands and change of name. Montgomery Ward and J.C. Penney left the mall closing their stores in the mall in 2001. This marked the beginning of the end of the mall as stores such as Sam Goody and Old Navy (which had moved in in 2000) closed their locations in 2003 with other big name stores following suit including Dillards.

Namco attempted unsuccessfully to sell the mall to General Growth Properties in 2004.

The property eventually went into bankruptcy in 2008; then foreclosure, the lender Madison Capital picked it up, Cityview Commercial was formed as a partner with Madison. A dynamic General Manager formed a partnership with the city, community, and ownership to assist with the endeavor of turning it around. Much progress was made, the General Manager resigned, and Boxer was hired to manage the property. The former General Manager is slated to rejoin it in April 2011 and is tasked with the final 25% of development and lease up. In 2015, Sears Holdings spun off 235 of its properties, including the Sears at Southwest Center Mall, into Seritage Growth Properties. In 2017, Macy's left the mall leaving another vacant anchor spot as the mall continued its struggles.

On October 15, 2018, it was announced that Sears would be closing as part of a plan to close 142 stores nationwide.

The future
Although the mall faced bankruptcy in 2008 and ultimately went through foreclosure, The Woodmont Company was hired by the Bankruptcy Trustee to manage it. In August 2008, Woodmont hired a dynamic general manager, which in turn created a team that truly revitalized it. The lender, Madison Capital, picked it up and Retail SWC Mall LLC was formed as a partner with Madison. The City of Dallas hired the ULI (Urban Land Institute) to assess the property and give their recommendations. The City of Dallas then paid to have the six-month option to purchase the former JCPenney building. They did not exercise their option. The former Dillard's building was being built out as a Fiesta Mundo and went into bankruptcy 2011. The general manager created a partnership with the city, community, lender, and ownership to assist with the endeavor of turning it around. Much progress was made, then the general manager resigned; Boxer followed as the management company. The former general manager rejoined it in April 2011 and is charged with the final development and lease up (last 25%).

Anchors
Burlington Coat Factory (formerly Montgomery Ward)
[(Former Sears)]
[(Former Dillard’s)]
[(Former JCPenney)]  and demolished
[(Former Macy's)]

See also 
List of shopping malls in the Dallas–Fort Worth Metroplex

References

Shopping malls in the Dallas–Fort Worth metroplex
Shopping malls established in 1975
Economy of Dallas